Aberconway, the anglicised form of the Welsh placename Aberconwy, may refer to:

Baron Aberconway, title in the British peerage
Charles McLaren, 1st Baron Aberconway (1850-1934), Scottish politician and jurist
 Laura McLaren, Baroness Aberconway (died 1933), British suffragist
 Henry McLaren, 2nd Baron Aberconway (1879-1953), British horticulturalist and industrialist
 Charles McLaren, 3rd Baron Aberconway (1913-2003), British horticulturalist and industrialist 
 Charles McLaren, 4th Baron Aberconway (born 1948), British peer

See also
Aberconwy (disambiguation)
Aberconway House, London, built for the 2nd Baron
Aberconway Medal of the Geological Society of London, named for the 3rd Baron